Political equality is the quality of a society whose voluntary members are of equal standing in terms of political power or influence. A founding principle of various forms of democracy, political egalitarianism was an idea which was supported by Thomas Jefferson and it is a concept similar to moral reciprocity and legal equality. The idea suggests all citizens of a certain country must be treated equally solely depending on their citizenship status, not on their race, religion and how clever or how rich they are. Equal citizenship constitutes the core of political egalitarianism. This is expressed in such principles as one person, one vote, equality before the law, and equal rights of free speech.

Equality before law 

Equality before law means that the law applies to all peoples without exceptions, therefore the law must be designed beforehand in a way that discrimination by the state become unthinkable. Fairness and justice concept should be followed and enforced by the state.

See also 
 Cause of action
 Due process
 Freedom of assembly
 Freedom of association
 Freedom of religion
 Freedom of speech
 Suffrage

References 

Political terminology
Egalitarianism